The Fidelity Wars is the second full-length album by British indie rock band Hefner. Recorded in London over a period of twelve days at Roundhouse Studios, it was released in 1999 on Too Pure. It was the first Hefner album to feature Jack Hayter.

It was reissued by lead singer Darren Hayman in 2008.

Track listing
All songs written by Darren Hayman except where noted.
 "The Hymn for the Cigarettes"
 "May God Protect Your Home"
 "The Hymn for the Alcohol"
 "I Took Her Love for Granted"
 "Every Little Gesture"
 "Weight of the Stars"
 "I Stole a Bride"
 "We Were Meant to Be"
 "Fat Kelly's Teeth"
 "Don't Flake Out on Me"
 "I Love Only You"

Track listing (2008 reissue)
CD 1
 "The Hymn for the Cigarettes"
 "May God Protect Your Home"
 "The Hymn for the Alcohol"
 "I Took Her Love for Granted"
 "Every Little Gesture"
 "Weight of the Stars"
 "I Stole a Bride"
 "We Were Meant to Be"
 "Fat Kelly's Teeth"
 "Don't Flake Out on Me"
 "I Love Only You"
 "Grandmother Dies" (b-side)
 "Lisa and Me" (b-side)
 "A Belly Full of Babies" (b-side)
 "Mary Lee" (The Hefner Heart EP)
 "The Hymn for the Things We Didn't Do" (The Hefner Heart EP)
 "Karen" (The Hefner Heart EP)
 "The Heart of Portland" (The Hefner Heart EP)
 "The Hymn for Thomas Courtney Warner" (The Hefner Heart EP)

CD 2
 "The Hymn for the Alcohol"(7" version)
 "My Art College Days Are Over" (b-side)
 "Don't Flake Out on Me" (4-track)
 "I Stole a Bride" (4-track)
 "May God Protect Your Home" (4-track)
 "A Belly Full of Babies" (4-track)
 "The Hymn for Thomas Courtney Warner" (4-track)
 "Blind Girl with Halo" (4-track)
 "Harlot's Teeth" (4-track)
 "I Took Her Love for Granted" (4-track)
 "Karen" (4-track)
 "The Hymn for the Cigarettes" (rehearsal)
 "We Were Meant to Be" (rehearsal)
 "You Need a Mess of Help to Stand Alone" (rehearsal) (Brian Wilson, Jack Rieley)
 originally recorded by The Beach Boys
 "I Took Her Love for Granted" (rehearsal)
 "I Love Only You" (rehearsal)
 "Kate Cleaver's House" (rehearsal)
 "Twisting Mary's Arm" (rehearsal)
 "The Weight of the Stars" (rehearsal)
 "The Girl from the Coast" (rehearsal)
 "The Librarian" (rehearsal)

Personnel

Hefner
Darren Hayman - vocals, guitar
Antony Harding - drums
John Morrison - bass guitar
Jack Hayter - flute, stylophone, pedal steel

Additional personnel
Neil Yates - trumpet, flugelhorn
Miti Adhikari - engineer, mixing
Simon Askew - assistant engineer
Peter Astor - guitar
Sean Doherty - assistant engineer
Martin Slattery - organ, tenor saxophone
Christopher Andrews - Scratching
Jeremy Gill - assistant engineer
Simon Morris - assistant engineer
Gina Birch - vocals
Matt Coleman - trombone

References 

1999 albums
Hefner (band) albums
Too Pure albums